Bärbel Köster (later Madaus, born 26 May 1957) is an East German sprint canoer who competed in the mid to late 1970s. She won a bronze medal in the K-2 500 m event at the 1976 Summer Olympics in Montreal.

Köster also won four gold medals at the ICF Canoe Sprint World Championships with two in the K-2 500 m event (both 1974 and 1975) and two in the K-4 500 m event (both 1974 and 1975).

References

1957 births
Canoeists at the 1976 Summer Olympics
East German female canoeists
Living people
Olympic canoeists of East Germany
Olympic bronze medalists for East Germany
Olympic medalists in canoeing
ICF Canoe Sprint World Championships medalists in kayak

Medalists at the 1976 Summer Olympics